The annual Mais Lecture has been hosted since 1978 by Bayes Business School (formerly Cass), part of City, University of London.

The lecture is named in honour of Lord Mais, the 645th Lord Mayor of the City of London (1972–73), and Pro-Chancellor of City University (1979–84). He played a key role in establishing City University's Centre of Excellence for Banking and Finance, now part of the wider Cass Faculty of Finance.

The lecture is regarded as a leading event for the banking and finance community of the City of London, having hosted a number of prestigious speakers including successive Prime Ministers, Chancellors of the Exchequer, and Governors of the Bank of England.

In January 2021 Anneliese Dodds MP, Shadow Chancellor of the Exchequer, became the first woman to give the Mais Lecture.

List of Mais Lectures

References

External links 
The Mais Lecture 1978-2012
The Mais Lecture: ten years on (Nigel Lawson at London School of Economics)

British lecture series
City, University of London
Finance in the United Kingdom
Fiscal policy